Jack Sweet (21 December 1919 – 7 September 2006) was an  Australian rules footballer who played with South Melbourne in the Victorian Football League (VFL).

Notes

External links 

1919 births
2006 deaths
Australian rules footballers from Western Australia
Sydney Swans players
East Perth Football Club players
Subiaco Football Club players
Subiaco Football Club coaches